Cédric Daury (born 19 October 1969) is French football manager and current player. He is currently the sporting director of Auxerre.

Club career
Daury played as a midfielder and striker, for Ligue 1 and Ligue 2 clubs Reims, Angers, Le Havre, Cannes, Laval and Châteauroux.

International career
Daury represented France at under-21 level.

Managerial career
Daury began his coaching career with Châteauroux's youth teams, before managing the first team from 2006 to 2008. In June 2009, he became Le Havre's manager, replacing Frédéric Hantz, Daury signed a two-year deal.

References

External links
 
 
 Cédric Daury at Tangofoot.free.fr 

1969 births
Living people
French footballers
France under-21 international footballers
French football managers
ES Viry-Châtillon players
Stade de Reims players
Angers SCO players
Le Havre AC players
AS Cannes players
Stade Lavallois players
LB Châteauroux players
Ligue 1 players
Ligue 2 players
Ligue 2 managers
LB Châteauroux managers
Le Havre AC managers
AJ Auxerre managers
Association football midfielders